Paul Chan may refer to:

 Paul Chan (artist) (born 1973), Hong Kong-born American artist
 Paul Chan Mo-po (born 1955), Hong Kong politician
 Paul Chan Wai-chi (born 1957), Macanese politician